The aardvark is an African mammal, Orycteropus afer.

Aardvark may also refer to:

Music
Aardvark Jazz Orchestra, an eclectic big band founded in 1973
The Aardvarks (band), an American garage rock band active in the 1960s
Aardvark (band), a British Prog Rock group of the early 1970s - Paul Kossoff and Simon Kirke were members before joining Free (band).

Characters
Aardvark, a character in The Ant and the Aardvark cartoon series voiced by John Byner
Captain Aardvark, a character in Joseph Heller's novel Catch-22
Otis the Aardvark presenter-puppet on CBBC 1994-2000
Cerebus the Aardvark, title-character in comic book series by Dave Sim

Computers
Aardvark (search engine), a social search service (2008-2011)
Project Aardvark, the early code name of Fog Creek Copilot remote access software
Aardvark (video game), from 1986

Other uses
Aardman animations is a British stop motion animation studio based in Bristol, England.
Aardvark (film), an American drama film
Aardvark cucumber, Cucumis humifructus, a kind of African cucumber
Aardvark JSFU, a military mine-flail vehicle
Aardvark-Vanaheim, a Canadian independent comic book publisher
Brazilian aardvark, an example of circular reporting
General Dynamics F-111 Aardvark, a military aircraft

See also
Aardwolf (disambiguation)